The year 2009 in Archosaur paleontology was eventful.  Archosaurs include the only living dinosaur group — birds — and the reptile crocodilians, plus all extinct dinosaurs,  extinct crocodilian relatives, and pterosaurs. Archosaur paleontology is the scientific study of those animals, especially as they existed before the Holocene Epoch began about 11,700 years ago.  The year 2009 in paleontology included various significant developments regarding archosaurs.

This article records new taxa of fossil archosaurs of every kind that have been described during the year 2009, as well as other significant discoveries and events related to paleontology of archosaurs that occurred in the year 2009.

Crurotarsans

Non-avian dinosaurs

Research

 A new study on theropod furculae is published.
 A "detailed description of the skull and mandible of the Chinese cerapodan ornithischian dinosaur Jeholosaurus shangyuanensis" is published.

Hadrosaur chewing study

A study titled "Quantitative analysis of dental microwear in hadrosaurid dinosaurs, and the implications for hypotheses of jaw mechanics and feeding" is published by British paleontologists Mark Purnell, Paul Barrett and student Vince Williams. The paper examined the chewing methods and diet of hadrosaurid ("duck billed") dinosaurs from the Late Cretaceous period. The scientists analyzed hundreds of microscopic scratches on the teeth of a fossilized Edmontosaurus jaw, and believe they determined exactly how a hadrosaur broke down and ate its food, which had previously eluded researchers.

The study found hadrosaurs had a unique way of eating unlike any creature living today. In contrast to a flexible lower jaw joint prevalent in today's mammals, hadrosaurs had a unique hinge between the upper jaws and the rest of its skull. The team found the dinosaur's upper jaws pushed outwards and sideways while chewing, as the lower jaw slid against the upper teeth.

The study also concluded that hadrosaurs likely grazed on horsetails and vegetation close to the ground, rather than browsing higher-growing leaves and twigs. However, Purnell said these conclusions were less secure than the more conclusive evidence regarding the motion of teeth while chewing. Previous studies found contradictory conclusions, and the issue remains a subject of debate.

The findings were published on June 30, 2009 in the journal, The Proceedings of the National Academy of Sciences. Purnell said no previous study had ever employed this method of analyzing microscopic teeth scratches, and that the method could be used to study other areas of scientific research.

New taxa

Data courtesy of George Olshevky's dinosaur genera list. ~44 dinosaur genera were erected in 2009.

Aves

Research

Newly described birds

Pterosaurs

See also

2010 in archosaur paleontology
2011 in archosaur paleontology
2012 in archosaur paleontology
2013 in archosaur paleontology

Notes

References 

2009 in paleontology